John de Nassington was the Archdeacon of Barnstaple from 1330 to 1349.

References

Archdeacons of Barnstaple